Kidson is a patronymic surname of English origin, derived from the given name Christopher.

People with the surname
Alfred Kidson (1863–1937), Australian lawyer and politician
Charles Kidson (1867–1908), New Zealand art teacher, artist, craftsman and sculptor
Edward Kidson (1882–1939), New Zealand meteorologist and scientific administrator
Elsa Kidson (1905–1979), New Zealand soil scientist and sculptor
Frank Kidson (1855–1926), English folk song collector and music scholar
Ruan Kidson (1972 - ), South Africa Occupational Health and Safety Practitioner

References

Patronymic surnames
Surnames from given names